Jamie Hagan (born 15 April 1987) is an Irish rugby player. He currently plays for the Béziers. Hagan was capped for  against  in 2013. His playing position is prop. Hagan is from Balbriggan in Dublin.

Career
Hagan started with the Leinster Rugby Academy. In 2009, he signed for Connacht on a two-year contract, starting at tighthead prop. He played  in fifty games for Connacht.
He returned to Leinster in 2011. Hagan scored only one try in his three years with Leinster, in a 42–13 win over Irish rivals Ulster.

It was announced on 25 March 2013 that Hagan will be joining Aviva Premiership side London Irish, on a three-year contract, at the end of the 2012–13 season.

It was announced on 17 November 2014 that Hagan is returning to Leinster Rugby on a short-term loan deal.

International
Hagan has represented Ireland at a Youth, U-18 and U-20 level and also Irish Wolfhounds.  He was a member of the 2007 Ireland Under-20 Grand Slam winning squad. In 2013, he represented  against  in Houston, replacing starting tight-head prop Mike Ross in the match.

Super Rugby Statistics

References

1987 births
Living people
Irish rugby union players
Connacht Rugby players
Leinster Rugby players
Ireland international rugby union players
Rugby union players from County Dublin
London Irish players
Melbourne Rebels players
AS Béziers Hérault players
Ireland Wolfhounds international rugby union players
Irish expatriate rugby union players
Expatriate rugby union players in Australia
Expatriate rugby union players in England
Expatriate rugby union players in France
Rugby union props
People from Balbriggan
Sportspeople from Fingal
Irish expatriate sportspeople in Australia
Irish expatriate sportspeople in France
Irish expatriate sportspeople in England